Saint-Bruno station is a commuter rail station operated by Exo in Saint-Bruno-de-Montarville, Quebec, Canada.

It is served by the Mont-Saint-Hilaire line.

Connecting bus routes

Réseau de transport de Longueuil

References

External links
 Saint-Bruno Commuter Train Station Information (RTM)
 Saint-Bruno Commuter Train Station Schedule (RTM)

Exo commuter rail stations
Saint-Bruno-de-Montarville
Railway stations in Montérégie
Railway stations in Canada opened in 2000
2000 establishments in Quebec